Life and Death is a 1980 Norwegian drama film directed by Petter Vennerød and Svend Wam. The film was selected as the Norwegian entry for the Best Foreign Language Film at the 53rd Academy Awards, but was not accepted as a nominee.

Cast
 Bjørn Skagestad as Jacob
 Kjersti Døvigen as Jennifer
 Sossen Krohg as Diddi
 Knut Husebø as Harald
 Wenche Foss as Fru Bergmann
 Per Sunderland as Alexander
 Jorunn Kjellsby as Tante Nøste
 Sverre Gran as Herr Bergmann
 Vibeke Falk as Tante Liss
 Svein Tindberg as Sundby

See also
 List of submissions to the 53rd Academy Awards for Best Foreign Language Film
 List of Norwegian submissions for the Academy Award for Best Foreign Language Film

References

External links
 

1980 films
1980 drama films
Films directed by Svend Wam
Films directed by Petter Vennerød
Norwegian drama films
1980s Norwegian-language films